ZAKA (abbreviation for Zihuy Korbanot Ason, literally: "Disaster Victim Identification") is a series of voluntary community emergency response teams in Israel, each operating in a police district (two in the Central District due to geographic considerations). These organizations are recognized by the Israeli government. The full name is "ZAKA – Identification, Extraction and Rescue – True Kindness". The two largest ZAKA factions are Zaka Tel Aviv and ZAKA Search and Rescue. 

Members of ZAKA, most of whom are Orthodox Jews, assist ambulance crews, aid in the identification of the victims of terrorism, road accidents and other disasters, and where necessary gather body parts and spilled blood for proper Jewish burial. They also provide first aid and rescue services, and help with the search for missing persons and participate in international rescue and recovery operations.

The founders and members of ZAKA prefer to call the organization and their work Chesed shel Emet ( – "Kindness of truth"), because they are dedicated to ensuring that the bodies of Jewish victims are buried according to Halakha, Jewish law. After acts of terrorism, ZAKA volunteers also collect the bodies and body parts of non-Jews, including suicide bombers, for return to their families. The phrase Chesed shel Emet refers to doing "kindness" for the benefit of the deceased, which is considered to be "true kindness", because the (deceased) beneficiaries of the kindness cannot return the kindness.

The organization employs around 3,500 volunteers. In 2017, its annual operating budget was about one million dollars.

History

The organization preceding ZAKA started when a group of volunteers gathered to assist in the recovery of human remains from a terrorist attack on bus line 405 in Israel in 1989.

The ZAKA network was set up in the early 1950s and was founded in the 1990s by Yehuda Meshi Zahav, Rabbi Shlomo Eisenbach, and Rabbi Tzvi Hussid as a non-profit organization in addition to its police status. This arrangement succeeded the ZAKA organization founded by Rabbi Gelbstein in 1989.

In 1995 the newly organized ZAKA Search and Rescue and ZAKA Tel Aviv were recognized by the Israeli government and now work closely with the Israel Police in the identification of disaster victims.

ZAKA activities expanded rapidly during the al-Aqsa Intifada (from September 2000), when frequent terrorist suicide bombings created many scenes of disaster, with the remains and body parts of many victims strewn around bombing sites.

In 2004, a group of ZAKA volunteers flew to The Hague, with the wreckage of the bus destroyed in the Jerusalem bus suicide bombing on 29 January 2004. The wreckage, along with pictures of 950 victims of terrorism, was taken to Washington, D.C. to urge the United States government to act against terrorism. The bus was later displayed at various US universities.

In January 2016, after two failed attempts, ZAKA was granted the status by the United Nations as a consultant non-governmental organization.

Organization
Currently, the Israeli government funds three ZAKA organizations demographically divided in different police districts in Israel. ZAKA Tel Aviv covers the Tel Aviv district. According to the most recent Police report ZAKA Tel Aviv responded to 550.33% more calls and had 410.20% more volunteers respond to emergencies than any other ZAKA.

In 2010, ZAKA volunteers numbered 1,500. These volunteers work in coordination with Israeli government agencies on any unnatural death including vehicle accidents, terrorist bombing, murder or suicide. Trained as paramedics and in first aid, the volunteers, who are on call 24/7, attempt to revive the victims and, if unsuccessful, respectfully attend to the dead.

ZAKA also has two units made up of Bedouin, Muslim, and Druze volunteers to serve Israel's non-Jewish communities, primarily Bedouin in the Negev and Druze in the Galilee. According to both Jewish and Muslim religious law, it is important to treat the dead respectfully, whether it be covering the bodies so that others cannot see them or collecting every last body part for burial, including blood. These units also function when religious Jews cannot, on the Jewish Sabbath and holidays. According to Jewish law, Jews may violate the Sabbath to save a life, but not to deal with the dead.

International rescue and recovery operations
In late 2004 and early 2005, members of ZAKA provided assistance in Thailand, Sri Lanka, India and Indonesia in the aftermath of the 2004 Indian Ocean earthquake. Forensic teams reportedly dubbed the group "the team that sleeps with the dead" because they toiled nearly 24 hours a day at Buddhist pagodas in Thailand that had been transformed into morgues to identify those who died in the tsunami. The experience of ZAKA members, who reportedly see 38 bodies a week on average in Israel, helped the Israeli forensic team to identify corpses faster than many of the other forensic teams that operated in Thailand in the aftermath of the disaster, which placed them in high demand with grieving families. 

In February 2007, ZAKA sent a 10-person search and rescue team, consisting primarily of rescue divers, to Paris to search for a missing Israeli Defense official. The mission was funded by the Defense Ministry at an expected cost of $80,000. 

In November 2008, ZAKA volunteers went to Mumbai, India following terrorist attacks that included a Jewish center among its targets.

Following the 2010 Haiti earthquake, a six-man ZAKA International Search and Rescue Unit delegation arrived in Haiti to assist with search and recovery efforts. Working with the Mexican military delegation and Jewish volunteers from Mexico, eight students trapped under the rubble of the collapsed eight-storey Port-au-Prince University building were rescued on the first day after their arrival.

Teams of ZAKA volunteers were sent to Japan in March 2011 to assist in search-and-rescue after the devastating earthquake and subsequent tsunami.

A ZAKA team went out with an Israeli mission to Nepal in late April 2015 to help search for casualties in the aftermath of the earthquake and subsequent avalanches.

In January 2017, a team of ZAKA volunteers worked overtime searching for survivors subsequent to a 7.0-level earthquake in Port-au-Prince, Haiti. 

In January 2019, a ZAKA team deployed in Brazil to conduct search and rescue operations following a dam collapse in Brumadinho.

Public recognition
In Israel, the primary Chesed Shel Emes organization is known as ZAKA, though other organizations exist. The devotion of the members of ZAKA and the professional manner in which they handled difficult and tragic scenes, such as the treatment of the bodies of victims killed in suicide bombings, led to strong public respect and admiration. The great contribution of ZAKA to Israeli society was soon widely recognized. This recognition enabled ZAKA to recruit more volunteers, and with growing monetary donations, purchase advanced equipment, such as first aid kits, ambulances, MIRS (communications) and motorcycles (for rapid response).

The increase in reputation, donations and manpower enabled ZAKA to participate in additional voluntary activities beyond disaster victim identification and supplying first aid. Such other activities include helping senior citizens and education initiatives to prevent road accidents.

One of the founders of ZAKA, Yehuda Meshi Zahav, was given the honor of lighting an honorary beacon on Israel's 55th Independence Day ceremonies on Mount Herzl in Jerusalem, the revered burial spot of modern Zionism's founder Theodor Herzl.

Controversy
In August 2007, ZAKA members were accused of burning down a secret crematorium in Israel. Most Jews believe Jews should be buried according to religious tradition, not cremated. ZAKA's founder Yehuda Meshi Zahav was reported to have called the existence of the crematorium a "desecration of the dead" and that the crematorium was "destined to disappear in flames." ZAKA strongly denied any involvement in the arson.

In March 2021, longtime ZAKA head Yehuda Meshi Zahav, following an investigation by Haaretz, faced multiple allegations of having committed repeated sex crimes, including on children as young as five years old. Meshi Zahav denied the allegations as nothing more than rumor-fuelled "gossip" and a "personal vendetta," but suspended himself from the organization and relinquished his upcoming Israel Prize award for lifetime achievements. Meanwhile, the Israel Police launched a criminal investigation into the allegations spearheaded by the Lahav 433 unit. On 22 April he was found unconscious in his apartment after having attempted suicide.

An investigation by the newspaper Haaretz in 2022 alleged that ZAKA inflated its number of volunteers, from less than 1,000 to more than 3,000, in order to receive more government support. The organization denied the charges.

See also
 Chesed Shel Emes
 Chevra kadisha
 Hatzalah
 Magen David Adom
 Misaskim

References

External links

 ZAKA USA Website
 ZAKA at the Jewish Virtual Library
 ZAKA: Always there when terror strikes
 ZAKA: Kindness Amid Terror - An Interview with a volunteer

Emergency management in Israel
Jewish medical organizations
Humanitarian aid organizations
Medical and health organizations based in Israel
Volunteer search and rescue organizations
Charities based in Israel
Emergency services in Israel
1989 establishments in Israel